The Kennebec Journal is a six-day morning daily newspaper published in Augusta, Maine. It is owned by MaineToday Media, which also publishes the state's largest newspaper, the Portland Press Herald.

The newspaper covers Augusta and the surrounding capital area and southern Kennebec County. Known colloquially as the "KJ".

History

The Kennebec Journal began publishing as a weekly newspaper in 1825, five years after Maine had become a state. 

James G. Blaine bought half of the newspaper in 1854 and became its editor. Blaine later served as United States Senator from Maine from 1876 to 1881, United States Secretary of State in 1881 and from 1889 to 1892. He was also the Republican Party's nominee for president during the 1884 election.

In November 1922, Charles F. Flint, general manager of The Kennebec Journal, and his three sons, Roy, Charles, and Leigh, purchased stock control of the newspaper. 

For much of the 20th century, the Journal (along with its sister papers the Press Herald and Morning Sentinel) was part of Guy Gannett Communications, a family-owned media company based in Maine. 

In 1998, Guy Gannett's newspapers were sold to Blethen Maine Newspapers, a subsidiary of The Seattle Times Company. The group was sold to MaineToday Media in 2009.

Prices
The price of each for the Saturday/Sunday “Weekend Edition” issue of The Kennebec Journal is $1.50, while the daily issues cost $1.00 each.

References

External links
 
 
 centralmaine.com, Kennebec Journal and Morning Sentinel (sister paper) official website
 The Seattle Times Company official website
 Kennebec Journal front pages on Newseum

Companies based in Augusta, Maine
Newspapers published in Maine
Publications established in 1825
1825 establishments in Maine